Pieter Van den Abeele is a computer programmer, and the founder of the PowerPC-version of Gentoo Linux, a foundation connected with a distribution of the Linux computer operating system. He founded Gentoo for OS X, for which he received a scholarship by Apple Computer. In 2004 Pieter was invited to the OpenSolaris pilot program and assisted Sun Microsystems with building a development eco-system around Solaris. Pieter was nominated for the OpenSolaris Community Advisory Board and managed a team of developers to make Gentoo available on the Solaris operating system as well. Pieter is a co-author of the Gentoo handbook.

The teams managed by Pieter Van den Abeele have shaped the PowerPC landscape with several "firsts". Gentoo/PowerPC was the first distribution to introduce PowerPC Live CDs. Gentoo also beat Apple to releasing a full 64-bit PowerPC userland environment for the IBM PowerPC 970 (G5) processor.

His Gentoo-based Home Media and Communication System, based on a Freescale Semiconductor PowerPC 7447 processor won the Best of Show award at the inaugural 2005 Freescale Technology Forum in Orlando, Florida. Pieter is also a member of the Power.org consortium and participates in committees and workgroups focusing on disruptive business plays around the Power Architecture.

References

People in information technology
Gentoo Linux people
Living people
Year of birth missing (living people)